August von Finck Jr. (11 March 1930 – 28 November 2021) was a Swiss-based German billionaire businessman. When he died, his net worth was estimated at US$8.8 billion.

Early life
Von Finck was born in 1930 in Munich, the son of August von Finck Sr., and the grandson of Wilhelm von Finck, who started a private bank in 1870 that became Merck Finck & Co.

Career
In February 2020, Von Finck sold the majority of his stake in Switzerland's SGS SA, one of the world's largest testing and inspection companies. He sold 960,000 shares valued at $2.4 billion.

According to Forbes, he had a net worth of US$8.8 billion when he died.

Other interests
The German state government of Baden-Württemberg authorized the sale of an incunable about Medieval history to him in 2008. The price was about Euro 20 million.

It is likely that Finck was a financial supporter of the German far right party AfD.

Personal life
Von Finck was married to Francine. They had four children and lived in Weinfelden Castle in Thurgau canton, Switzerland. His eldest son is August François von Finck.

He died on 28 November 2021, at the age of 91.

References 

1930 births
2021 deaths
German bankers
German billionaires
German untitled nobility
German expatriates in Switzerland
Finck family
People from Weinfelden
20th-century German businesspeople
21st-century German businesspeople